The Dupe is a 1916 American drama silent film directed by Frank Reicher and written by Hector Turnbull and Margaret Turnbull. The film stars Blanche Sweet, Ernest Joy, Veda McEvers and Thomas Meighan. The film was released on July 2, 1916, by Paramount Pictures.

Plot

Cast 
Blanche Sweet as Ethel Hale
Ernest Joy as Mr. Strong
Veda McEvers as Mrs. Strong
Thomas Meighan as Jimmy Regan

References

External links 
 

1916 films
1910s English-language films
Silent American drama films
1916 drama films
Paramount Pictures films
American black-and-white films
American silent feature films
Films directed by Frank Reicher
1910s American films